The Legislative Assembly of Nizhny Novgorod Oblast is the regional parliament of Nizhny Novgorod Oblast, a federal subject of Russia. It is a unicameral body with a total of 50 representatives (deputies) elected for a 5-year term. 25 deputies are elected in single-seat electoral constituencies and 25 members are elected by a single (regional) constituency in proportion to the number of votes cast for the lists of candidates nominated by electoral associations. It acts on the basis of the Charter of Nizhny Novgorod Oblast.

Elections

2016

2021

List of chairmen

References 

1994 establishments in Russia
Legislatures of the federal subjects of Russia
Politics of Nizhny Novgorod Oblast